Santacittārāma is the name of the Italian Theravada Buddhist monastery in the Thai Forest Tradition lineage of Ajahn Chah located near Rome. In the spring of 1990 the Italian Bhikkhu Ajahn Thanavaro (later Mario Thanavaro) and then Anagārika John Angelori were sent by Ajahn Sumedho to take up residence in a small house outside the village of Sezze south of Rome. Later, with an important contribution from the Thai community, a more suitable location was found in Poggio Nativo in the countryside of Sabina. and a larger monastery was established in 1997 with separate buildings for visitors and Kutis in the woods for residents and visiting Bhikkhus. Mrs. Natchari Thananan, the wife of the Thai Ambassador to Italy, Anurak Thananan, was instrumental in raising funds for this monastery. Some years later the Santacittārāma Association acquired an adjoining property, with a building used mainly to accommodate elderly monks (Nirodha), and a large Temple was constructed.

Sangha composition as of Sept. 2020
Ajahn Chandapalo (British / Italian) - Abbot
Ajahn Jutindharo (Thai / Italian)
Ajahn Suvaco (Thai)
Ajahn Mahapañño (Italian)
Bhikkhu Ice (Thai)
Bhikkhu Knight (Thai)
Bhikkhu Mahabodhi (Italian)
Bhikkhu Jayaviro (Italian)
Samanera Jayamangalo (Italian)
Samanera Santidharo (Italian)
Samanera Silanando (Italian)
Samanera Thitamedho (Italian)
Samanera Khemaviro (Swedish)
Samanera Nimmalo (Italian)
Anagarika Lionel (Swiss)

See also
Thai Forest Tradition
Ajahn Chah
Ajahn Sumedho
Wat Pah Pong, Thailand
Wat Pah Nanachat, Thailand
Amaravati Buddhist Monastery, UK
Chithurst Buddhist Monastery, UK
Aruna Ratanagiri, UK
Abhayagiri Buddhist Monastery, USA
Bodhinyana Monastery, Australia
Birken Forest Buddhist Monastery, Canada

External links

Friends of Santacittārāma, supporters’ website

Buddhist temples and monasteries of the Thai Forest Tradition
Buddhist monasteries in Italy
Thai diaspora in Europe